"Holiday" is the fourth and final single released from American hip hop trio Naughty by Nature's fifth album, Nineteen Naughty Nine: Nature's Fury. The song is built entirely around a dramatically slowed down sample of Change's 1980 number-one US dance hit "A Lover's Holiday". The song was released in October 1999 and was the final release that Naughty by Nature released during their short-lived tenure at Arista Records.

"Holiday" narrowly missed the US Billboard Hot R&B/Hip-Hop Singles & Tracks chart, instead making it to number one on the Bubbling Under R&B/Hip-Hop Singles listing. Worldwide, the single reached number six on Canada's RPM Dance chart, number eight in Australia, and number 50 in France.

Track listings
Australian and European CD single
 "Holiday" (radio mix) – 4:10
 "Holiday" (Hot 40 remix) – 3:59
 "Holiday" (radio mix instrumental) – 4:10
 "On the Run" (radio mix) – 3:21
 "On the Run" (radio mix instrumental) – 3:21

French CD and 12-inch single
 "Holiday" – 4:08
 "Live or Die" (radio mix) – 3:41

Charts

Weekly charts

Year-end charts

Certifications

References

1999 singles
1999 songs
Arista Records singles
Naughty by Nature songs
Song recordings produced by Naughty by Nature
Songs written by KayGee
Songs written by Vin Rock
Songs written by Treach